Shenxian may refer to:

 Xian (Taoism), or shenxian (神仙), Taoist immortal
 Shen County or Shenxian (莘县), in Shandong province

See also
Shengzhou, formerly known as Shengxian, a county-level city in Zhejiang province